Wau Stadium is a soccer specific stadium in Wau, South Sudan. It is home to Wau Salaam FC.

Wau Stadium timeline
November 1 2017; After a wind storm nearly destroyed the stadium, Wau Governor Angelo Taban announced a call for engineers and technicians to design a new stadium, while demolishing the old one.

References

Football venues in South Sudan